William Payne (8 August 1883 – 24 October 1940) was an Australian rules footballer who played with Fitzroy in the Victorian Football League (VFL).

Notes

External links 

1883 births
1940 deaths
Australian rules footballers from Victoria (Australia)
Fitzroy Football Club players